The Metropolitan Nashville Police Department is the primary provider of law enforcement services for Metropolitan Nashville and Davidson County, Tennessee. The MNPD covers a total area of  that encompasses everything from high density urban locations to rural areas.

History 
The Nashville Police Department was formed in 1806. The department became the Metropolitan Nashville Police Department in 1963, when the city of Nashville and Davidson County consolidated into a single city-county government.

Blue Lites 
The Blue Lites were a rock and roll musical band whose members worked for the Metropolitan Nashville Police Department. The band was founded in 1972 and was active from the 1970's-80's. The band performed in many public schools in Nashville. The band performed at the dedication of Riverfront Park in 1983, at a fundraiser for the American Red Cross in 1987, and at various fundraisers for other non-profit organizations in 1988.

Composition and organization

The department personnel includes over 1450 full-time sworn members.  The department responds to more than 950,000 police calls per year on average.  The most recent census ranked Nashville as the 21st largest U.S. city.  In 2000 the Department of Justice ranked the Metropolitan Nashville Police Department as the 36th largest U.S. police department.

The department is configured in a decentralized format, providing its precinct commanders with control of their own resources to address issues and crime trends in their areas.  The department is divided into eight precincts: North, South, East, West, Central, Hermitage, Madison, and Midtown Hills.  A precinct is designed similarly to a medium-sized police department, with uniform patrol, undercover officers, directed patrol officers, plainclothes detectives, and other specialties. In February 2019, a new headquarters was opened at 600 Murfreesboro Pike. This replaced the old headquarters, which was located at 200 James Robertson Parkway.

The precincts are supported by Administrative Services, Investigative Services, and Special Operations Division personnel, all in an effort to deter, detect, prevent, and respond to criminal trends in the precinct areas.  The department's entire focus is on how to quickly identify trends and implement initiatives that address them.

Rank structure

The rank structure of the MNPD is as follows:

Operation Safer Streets
Since 2005, the Metropolitan Nashville Police Department has been involved in Operation Safer Streets. Due to the growing  gang problem on the streets of Nashville with gangs such as Kurdish Pride, MS-13, Bloods, and Crips, the department has set up surveillance in the South Nashville neighborhoods to put pressure on the gang members. The team had originally only 14 officers who worked Friday, Saturday, and Sunday. These 14 officers stepped up Patrol in areas that have had a high concentration of gang activity, which include Madison and Antioch areas. In March 2008, the department added 23 more officers to the anti-gang team. Then-Chief of Police Ronal W. Serpas stated that this step up in patrol was intended to send a message that he would not tolerate gang activity in Nashville.
 
In August 2009 Nashville appeared on Season Four Episode 23 (Hunt and Kill) of the TV Show "Gangland" featuring the street gang, "Brown Pride". This show highlights several local gang members, both arrested and out on the street, who talk about their lives in the gangs.
 
Activists disputes that Operation Safer Streets is effective and alleges that the program has disproportionately affected black and brown neighborhoods.

See also
 Shooting of Jocques Clemmons
 List of law enforcement agencies in Tennessee

References

External links
 Official website
 

Davidson County, Tennessee
Municipal police departments of Tennessee
County police departments of Tennessee
Government of Nashville, Tennessee
1806 establishments in Tennessee